State Route 211 (SR 211) is a  state highway that serves as a connection between Gadsden and Interstate 59 (I-59) in Reece City in central Etowah County. SR 211 intersects US 278 and US 431 at its southern terminus and US 11 at its northern terminus.

Route description

SR 211 begins at its intersection with US 278/US 431 in central Gadsden. The route progresses in a northwesterly direction until it approaches Noccalula Falls Park where its turns in a northerly direction. SR 211 continues in its northwesterly track through Reece City where it intersects I-59 prior to reaching its northern terminus at US 11.

Major intersections

References

211
Transportation in Etowah County, Alabama
Gadsden, Alabama